Gastouni is a town and a former municipality in Elis, West Greece, Greece. Since the 2011 local government reform it is part of the municipality Pineios, of which it is the seat and a municipal unit. The municipal unit has an area of 59.325 km2. Gastouni is situated in a flat rural area, 5 km from the Ionian Sea. The river Pineios flows into the sea near Gastouni. The population of the town proper was 7,485 in 2011. The Greek National Road 9/E55 (Patras - Pyrgos) and the railway from Patras to Pyrgos pass east of Gastouni. There is a 12th-century Byzantine church in the southwestern quarter Katholiki.

Subdivisions
The municipal unit Gastouni is subdivided into the following communities:
Gastouni
Kardiakafti
Kavasila
Koroivos
Lefkochori
Palaiochori
Roupaki

Population history

People

Nikos Kachtitis, writer
The Sisinis family
Chrysanthos Sisinis
Georgios Sisinis, one of the famous Greek revolutionary leaders of the area

See also

List of settlements in Elis

References

External links
Gastouni.com (in Greek)
Gastouni (town) on GTP Travel Pages
Gastouni (municipality) on GTP Travel Pages

 
Populated places in Elis